Tracy Anderson (born March 3, 1975) is an American fitness entrepreneur and author. She is best known for her Tracy Anderson Method and for having various celebrity clients.

Early life and career
The daughter of dance instructor Diana Ephlin, Anderson trained in dance from an early age in Noblesville, Indiana. She initially hoped to become a professional dancer in New York City. After a 40 lb. weight gain during her first year in New York City, Anderson switched her focus to weight loss/fitness training as a career. Anderson has gym locations in Los Angeles, New York City, The Hamptons, Spain and London and has a DVD collection for at-home training. In 2015, Tracy Anderson launched an online fitness program called TA Video Streaming. Each week, subscribers receive new workouts filmed in real-time at one of her studios. The online streaming workouts are divided into beginner (sTArt), intermediate (fundamenTAl) and advanced (atTAin). 

She issued a pregnancy workout DVD collection aimed at women in the pre-and-postnatal periods.

Critical reviews 
In an April 2015 article in The Washington Post, personal trainer Kat Whitfield asserts that Anderson's methods "certainly don’t follow exercise physiology principles."

Personal life 
Tracy Anderson married basketball player Eric Anderson in 1998 and their son Sam was born that same year. The couple divorced in 2008. Eric Anderson died in 2018. On September 27, 2011, she married Matthew Mogol. Their daughter, Penelope, was born in May 2012. In 2013, Anderson and Mogol split. In 2016, Anderson began dating Scottish-born hedge fund manager Nicholas Riley. They announced their engagement in early 2018 on Instagram. Anderson has expressed a desire to have another child. In April 2018, sources reported that Riley had called off their engagement.

References

External links 
 
 

1975 births
American exercise instructors
Living people